Edward Stotz, Sr (1868–1948), was an American architect based in the city of Pittsburgh. He designed numerous buildings in the late 19th and early 20th century that are now listed as significant by the National Register of Historic Places and the Pittsburgh History and Landmarks Foundation.

Born in Allegheny City, now commonly known as the North Side of Pittsburgh, PA, Stotz spent a brief time in Europe before setting up shop in his home region in 1893.  He established the architecture firm that is now MacLachlan, Cornelius, & Filoni, along the way holding the presidency of the Pennsylvania State Association of Architects, a forerunner to the PA chapter of the American Institute of Architects and designing numerous school buildings, churches, and other buildings of interest along the way. He was also the father of Charles M. Stotz, also an architect, photographer, and an advocate for preservation of historic structures in and around the city.

Some noted regional examples of Stotz's work include Schenley High School in the Oakland neighborhood, Fifth Avenue High School, St. Kieran Church, and Church of the Epiphany near the Bluff section of the city, and the Oakmont golf course clubhouse in Plum borough.

He was the great grandfather of Andrew Stotz.

Buildings
Italics denote a Nationally Registered Historic Place:

References 

1868 births
1948 deaths
Architects from Pittsburgh
Architects of Roman Catholic churches